The 2018–19 Florida A&M Lady Rattlers basketball team represented Florida A&M University during the 2018–19 college basketball season. The Rattlers were led by ninth-year head coach LeDawn Gibson, until she was fired on February 12, 2019. Assistant coach Kevin Lynum took over as interim head coach for the remainder of the season. The Lady Rattlers, members of the Mid-Eastern Athletic Conference, played their home games at the Alfred Lawson, Jr. Multipurpose Center. They finished the season 4–25, 2–14 in ACC play to finish in last place. They lost in the first round of the MEAC women's tournament to Howard.

Roster

Schedule and results

|-
!colspan=9 style=| Non-conference regular season

|-
!colspan=9 style=| MEAC regular season

|-
!colspan=9 style=| MEAC Women's Tournament

See also
 2018–19 Florida A&M Rattlers basketball team

References

Florida A&M Lady Rattlers basketball seasons
Clemson
Florida AandM Lady Rattlers
Florida AandM Lady Rattlers